The Bear Valley National Wildlife Refuge is a wildlife refuge in the southwestern part of Klamath County, Oregon, near the California border. It was established in 1978 to protect the nesting areas of bald eagles. The refuge is part of the Klamath Basin National Wildlife Refuge Complex and has an area of  It is administered along with the other refuges in the complex from offices in Tulelake, California.

See also 
 List of Klamath Basin birds
 List of National Wildlife Refuges of the United States

References

External links 
 Bear Valley National Wildlife Refuge from the U.S. Fish and Wildlife Service

Protected areas of Klamath County, Oregon
National Wildlife Refuges in Oregon
1978 establishments in Oregon
Protected areas established in 1978